Then locomotives of Württemberg Class A were express train steam locomotives operated by the Royal Württemberg State Railways. They were built from 1878 by the Maschinenfabrik Esslingen engineering works.

In the mid-1860s the Württemberg State Railways turned away from the 4-4-0 American-influenced locomotives and went back to 2-4-0 locomotives, because they were cheaper to buy and maintain. They even converted some 4-4-0s to 2-4-0 engines. 

The engines had a tender of Class 2 T 10 and were recognisable by their large steam dome, that was located just behind the only slightly higher chimney.

Two locomotives ended up in the final DRG renumbering plan of 1925 as the DRG Class 34.81. Number 34 8101 was the former 336, that in 1896 had been converted from a Württemberg Aa. Number 34 8102, formerly 363, was by contrast newly built in 1891. Both locomotives were retired in 1925.

See also
Royal Württemberg State Railways
List of Württemberg locomotives and railbuses

References

4-4-0 locomotives
A
Esslingen locomotives
Railway locomotives introduced in 1878
Standard gauge locomotives of Germany
1B n2 locomotives
Passenger locomotives